The Long Beach ePrix was an annual race of the single-seater, electrically powered Formula E championship, held in Long Beach, United States. It was raced in the 2014–15 and the 2015–16 seasons.

Circuit
A modified version of the Long Beach Grand Prix track was used for this ePrix.

Results

References

 
Long Beach
Auto races in the United States
Sports in Long Beach, California
Recurring sporting events established in 2015
2015 establishments in California